The 2005–06 season saw Dunfermline Athletic compete in the Scottish Premier League where they finished in 11th position with 33 points. They also reached the 2006 Scottish League Cup Final where they lost 3–0 to Celtic.

Final league table

Results
Dunfermline Athletic's score comes first

Legend

Scottish Premier League

Scottish Cup

Scottish League Cup

References

External links
 Dunfermline Athletic 2005–06 at Soccerbase.com (select relevant season from dropdown list)

Dunfermline Athletic F.C. seasons
Dunfermline Athletic